Salegentibacter holothuriorum is a Gram-negative, strictly aerobic and non-motile bacterium from the genus of Salegentibacter which has been isolated from the sea cucumber Apostichopus japonicus from the Sea of Japan.

References

Flavobacteria
Bacteria described in 2004